La Voix de l'Est ('The Voice of the East') was a French Communist Party local weekly newspaper published from Bagnolet, France. The newspaper was founded in 1932. In 1935, it had a circulation of 8,000 and by 1937 the circulation had reached 12,1000. In the mid-1930s Coudert, the mayor of Bagnolet, was the director of the newspaper.

La Voix de l'Est continued publication after the Second World War.

References

1932 establishments in France
Defunct newspapers published in France
French-language communist newspapers
History of the French Communist Party
Newspapers published in Paris
Publications established in 1932